Cedrik-Marcel Stebe was the defending champion, but did not compete that year.

Kimmer Coppejans won the title, defeating Lucas Pouille in the final, 4–6, 6–2, 6–2. It was his first Challenger title in his career.

Seeds

Draw

Finals

Top half

Bottom half

References
 Main Draw
 Qualifying Draw

Morocco - Meknes - Singles
2014 Singles
Meknes - Singles